Au Revoir Shanghai is a TVB period drama series produced in 2005, released overseas in May 2006, and aired on TVB Pay Vision Channel in August 2008.

Synopsis
Nip Jun was a hit man but decided to leave the mafia to start a new life with his wife and daughter but tragedy stuck when his wife was killed in a car accident. Man Wa is Nip Jun's daughter and they own a restaurant in Shanghai. Kow Jai is an orphan who was mentored by Jun. He starts to develop feelings for Jun's daughter, Man Wa.

Cast

TVB dramas
2006 Hong Kong television series debuts
2006 Hong Kong television series endings
2008 Hong Kong television series debuts
2008 Hong Kong television series endings